The Rassam cylinder is a cuneiform cylinder, forming a prism with ten faces, written by Neo-Assyrian king Ashurbanipal in the 7th century BCE, in 643 BCE. The cylinder was discovered in the North Palace of Nineveh by Hormuzd Rassam in 1854, hence its name. It is located in the British Museum.

Content
The cylinder describes in detail nine military campaigns of Ashurbanipal. The content of the cylinder has been listed as follows:

Extracts
One of these is his victorious campaign in Egypt:

Some reliefs from Nineveh are otherwise known that illustrate these campaigns.

A full translation of the cylinder was made by Luckenbill in Ancient Records of Assyria and Babylonia. A full transcription of the cuneiform is available on CDLI.

Important words

References

7th-century BC works
1879 archaeological discoveries
Akkadian inscriptions
Ancient Near and Middle East clay objects
Art and cultural repatriation
Middle Eastern objects in the British Museum
Iraq–United Kingdom relations